Secrets of State is a 2008 French thriller film directed by Philippe Haïm.

Cast 

 Gérard Lanvin - Alex
 Vahina Giocante - Diane / Lisa
 Nicolas Duvauchelle - Pierre
 Mehdi Nebbou - Ahmed
 Rachida Brakni - Leïla / Chadia
 Catherine Hiegel - Pierre's mother
 Simon Abkarian - Al Barad
 Aurélien Wiik - Jérémy
 Nicolas Marié - Fouche
  - Aline
  - Aziz

References

External links 

2008 thriller films
2008 films
French thriller films
2000s French films